This article lists the chairpersons of the Party of Democratic Action.

The president of the Party of Democratic Action is the most senior political figure within the party. Since 25 September 2014, the office has been held by Bakir Izetbegović, following the death of Sulejman Tihić.

List of officeholders

References

External links

Party of Democratic Action
Bosnia and Herzegovina politicians
Bosniak politicians
Party of Democratic Action politicians
Party of Democratic Action